Carr Creek Lake (formerly Carr Fork Lake), located east of Hazard, Kentucky, along Kentucky Route 15 in Knott County, is a  reservoir created by the U.S. Army Corps of Engineers in 1976. Carr Creek Lake's earth and rock fill dam is 130 ft (40 m) tall and 720 ft (219 m) long, and the dam is located 8.8 mi (14 km) above the mouth of Carr Fork River, a tributary of the North Fork Kentucky River.

The lake is the main attraction of Carr Creek State Park.

References

External links
Recreation.gov - Carr Creek Lake
Carr Creek State Park facilities map

1976 establishments in Kentucky
Protected areas of Knott County, Kentucky
Reservoirs in Kentucky
Bodies of water of Knott County, Kentucky